Thomas Bührer (born 30 January 1968) is a Swiss orienteering competitor, winner of the 2003 World Orienteering Championships, Long distance. He is also three times Relay world champion, as a member of the Swiss winning teams in 1991, 1993 and 1995.

References

External links
 
 

1968 births
Living people
Swiss orienteers
Male orienteers
Foot orienteers
World Orienteering Championships medalists